Sir Charles Richard Bean (born 16 September 1953) is a British economist and Professor of Economics at the London School of Economics. He was previously Deputy Governor for Monetary Policy at the Bank of England from 1 July 2008 until 30 June 2014. From 2000 to 2008, he served as Chief Economist at the Bank.

Bean attended Brentwood School and Emmanuel College, Cambridge, and was a contemporary of the comedian Griff Rhys Jones at both and the writer, Douglas Adams, and the Member of Parliament (MP) Fabian Hamilton at Brentwood School. He gained his PhD at the Massachusetts Institute of Technology in 1981 with a thesis titled Essays in unemployment and economic activity under the supervision of Robert Solow. In 1990 he was visiting Professor at Stanford University in 1990, and then a lecturer at the London School of Economics, becoming a professor in 1990 and head of the Economics Department in 1999.

He has published articles on European unemployment, the Economic and Monetary Union, and on macroeconomics generally. He was Managing Editor of the Review of Economic Studies from 1986 to 1990. Bean has also served in a variety of public policy roles, such as consultant to Her Majesty's Treasury and as special adviser to both the Treasury Committee of the House of Commons and to the Economic and Monetary Affairs Committee of the European Parliament. He was a special adviser to the House of Lords enquiry into the European Central Bank.

He was knighted in the 2014 Birthday Honours for services to monetary policy and central banking. He is a fellow of the European Economic Association.

References

External links 
 Bank of England biography

1953 births
Living people
Academics of the London School of Economics
British economists
Alumni of Emmanuel College, Cambridge
MIT School of Humanities, Arts, and Social Sciences alumni
Civil servants in HM Treasury
People educated at Brentwood School, Essex
Deputy Governors of the Bank of England
Knights Bachelor
Fellows of the European Economic Association